TV9 Bangla is an Indian Bengali-language news channel based in Kolkata, West Bengal, India. It was launched on 14 January 2021.

See also
List of Bengali TV channels
List of Indian television stations

References

External links

Television channels and stations established in 2021
24-hour television news channels in India
TV9 Group
Television stations in Kolkata
Bengali-language television channels in India
2021 establishments in West Bengal